The Centro is a neighborhood of the city of Duque de Caxias in Metropolitan Region of Rio de Janeiro, part of the 1 District in city. At the city center are located the bus terminal, the train station in Duque de Caxias, the home school samba Acadêmicos do Grande Rio, the Cathedral of St. Anthony and the Market People Duque de Caxias.

Neighbourhoods of Duque de Caxias, Rio de Janeiro